Sean Malka (born April 27, 1993) is an Israeli footballer who currently plays at Hapoel Rishon LeZion.

Career
Malka played in the youth of Hapoel Tel Aviv. In summer 2012 was on loan to Hapoel Petah Tikva and returned after the season to Hapoel Tel Aviv. On 22 September 2013 he made his debut in 1–3 victory against Maccabi Petah Tikva.

On 7 July 2015 signed again to Hapoel Petah Tikva after he released from Hapoel.

References

External links
 

1993 births
Living people
Israeli footballers
Hapoel Tel Aviv F.C. players
Hapoel Petah Tikva F.C. players
Hapoel Rishon LeZion F.C. players
Hapoel Ashkelon F.C. players
Bnei Yehuda Tel Aviv F.C. players
Maccabi Yavne F.C. players
Hapoel Kfar Shalem F.C. players
Israeli Premier League players
Liga Leumit players
Footballers from Bat Yam
Israeli people of Moroccan-Jewish descent
Association football midfielders